Al-Watan is a privately owned government-aligned Syrian Arabic language daily newspaper published in Syria.

History and profile
Al Watan was launched in 2006. The paper is published by the Syrian Arab Publishing and Distributing Company. It is the country's first private daily newspaper since the 1960s (not counting the state party organ Al-Baath), but its editorial line and reporting is practically identical to that of the public-owned papers. In fact, the owner of the daily is the cousin of the Syrian President Bashar al-Assad, Rami Makhlouf. Its sister daily is Al Iqtissadiya.

The online edition of the paper was the 33rd most visited website for 2010 in the MENA region.

References

2006 establishments in Syria
Publications established in 2006
Al-Watan
Mass media in Damascus
Al-Watan